The Union Pacific Bridge (Two Rivers Bridge) is the first bridge on the Kansas River at Kansas City.  It was built in 1904, and is a four span, through-truss structure carrying a single railroad track.  It is located immediately north from the Intercity Viaduct.  It replaces the first bridge at this location, which was destroyed by a flood in 1903.

Bridges over the Kansas River
Bridges in Kansas City, Kansas
Railroad bridges in Kansas
Two Rivers
Bridges completed in 1903
Chicago Great Western Railway
Truss bridges in the United States